The  were underground paramilitary units organized by the Japanese Communist Party (JCP) in the early 1950s for the purpose of carrying out Maoist-inspired guerrilla operations against the Japanese government and the Allied Occupation of Japan. The units were formed under the guidance of the Interim Central Directorate of the JCP, an informal group created by the party’s majority Shokanha faction, and sought to foment a nationwide communist revolution in emulatingo Mao Zedong's strategy of forming a base of operations in rural villages, but achieved no successes and proved a disaster for the party's political prospects going forward.

Background and history 
In November 1949 China's Liu Shaoqi urged spreading China's methods of armed struggle across Asia including in Japan. He proposed this on the basis of his talks with Joseph Stalin.

On 6 June 1950 Douglas MacArthur, the Supreme Commander for the Allied Powers, ordered a purge of 24 members of JCP's Central Committee and forbade them from engaging in any political activities. General Secretary Kyuichi Tokuda and his allies saw this repression as a perfect opportunity to take personal control of the party and, through an informal process that did not involve convening the Central Committee or the Politburo, he named the Interim Central Directorate. Tokuda excluded seven Central Committee members, including Kenji Miyamoto, who held dissenting points of view, and went underground.

Following the Red Purge, Tokuda and his group went into exile in China and on 23 February 1951, at the JCP's 4th National Conference, they decided on a policy of armed resistance against the American occupation of Japan, issuing orders to form a "liberated zone" in the rural villages across the country, particularly among peasants in mountain villages, just like the tactics employed by the Chinese Communist Party in the Second Sino-Japanese War. At the 5th National Conference of October 16 a new manifesto-like document was adopted called "Present Demands of the Japanese Communist Party" which included clauses on waging guerrilla war in the villages.

The armed struggle was activated throughout the country, including terrorist attacks on police officers, arson against police boxes and bombing trains. Then in July 1952 the Subversive Activities Prevention Law was enacted and enforced to clamp down on the JCP's attacks. Direct attacks with Molotov cocktails, the preferred weapon of the insurgents, abated from about the summer of 1952 but the JCP's militant policy did not change and operations in the countryside were continued.

These campaign tactics also drew the ire of popular opinion and they suffered a setback in the elections of October 1952 in which all their candidates were defeated.  On 1 January 1955 the Japanese Communist Party engaged in self-criticism, labeling the insurgency "adventurism of the extreme left", and at the 6th National Conference of 29 July 1955 the policy of armed struggle was renounced.  After the 6th National Conference the JCP adopted a policy of not excluding any party members who, though they had made mistakes, recognized the errors of the armed struggle and party split and intended sincerely to make effort in supporting the new party line. People who didn't accept this shift by the party to peaceful accommodation formed the nucleus of a variety of Japanese New Left movements.

Currently, JCP's official evaluation is that "The policy of the 5th National Conference was not officially adopted by the party but rather was born from the breakup and subsequent takeover of the party apparatus by Tokuda's Shokanha faction and the imposition of armed struggle on us by the Soviet Union and China. The division of the party and the extreme-left adventurism orchestrated by the Shokanha were a serious mistake."

How to Raise Flower Bulbs 
How to Raise Flower Bulbs was the secret publication setting out concepts relating to the party’s military policy such as construction and use of Molotov cocktails. It was actually an official bulletin called Internal and External Critiques, but took the title of How to Raise Flower Bulbs in order to disguise that. It was published several times through mimeograph.

Participation in the Mountain Village Operation Units 
The policy of establishing the Mountain Village Operation Units was out of touch with the real situation in the countryside and they were not supported at all by the locals. The exception was the travelling clinics operated by deployed medical teams who were greeted warmly in many of the villages they visited without local doctors. However, their arts and culture-based campaign, including such thing as kamishibai attacking "feudalistic" landlords, was not accepted by locals and their newspapers and propaganda leaflets were quickly handed over to the police. Without achieving any of its aims, the operations of the Mountain Village Operation Units were extinguished by a police crackdown.

In deference to the policy of the JCP, there were also students who had quit their studies and joined the Mountain Village Operation Units. It is said that these participants were in deep despair at the change in policy of the 6th National Conference. Some of the members who escaped exposure in the police crackdown holed up in the mountains and aimed to support themselves but, being neglected and unsupplied by the JCP, they naturally dissolved. The recollections of participants are published in certain new left bulletins, and the Mountain Village Operation Units at the time of the 6th National Conference is the backdrop for Sho Shibata's Akutagawa Award-winning 1964 novel Saredo Warera ga Hibi ("Those Were the Days, However...").

On the other hand, it is thought that there were differences in the directive and goals of “Y Organization” on the one hand, the JCP’s Military Affairs Committee including the Chukaku Jieitai and Dokuritsu Yugekitai which were purely in the armed struggle, and the Mountain Village Operation Units on the other hand where armed struggle coexisted with appeals to the masses. There were also people among the members of Mountain Village Operation Units who thought that the policy of armed struggle was an absurd idea and remained active in the Units without supporting the policy. Participation in the Units was by the appointment of the JCP Directorate which supported Kyuichi Tokuda’s Shokanha faction, and there are some who testified that service was assigned as a punishment to students who had belonged to the former faction of Kenji Miyamoto.

Bibliography 
 Kenichi Wakita　『朝鮮戦争と吹田・枚方事件－戦後史の空白を埋める』　Akashi Shoten、2004.
 『日本共産党の八十年　1922～2002』　Japanese Communist Party Central Committee Publishing Bureau、2003.

References 

Military units and formations established in 1951
Military units and formations disestablished in 1955
1951 establishments in Japan
1955 disestablishments in Japan
Japanese Communist Party
Military wings of communist parties